Prionovolva freemani is a species of sea snail, a marine gastropod mollusk in the family Ovulidae, the ovulids, cowry allies or false cowries.

Description
The shell size varies between 4 mm and 8 mm

Distribution
This species occurs in the Indian Ocean along Mozambique and South Africa

References

 Lorenz F. & Fehse D. (2009). The Living Ovulidae – A manual of the families of Allied Cowries: Ovulidae, Pediculariidae and Eocypraeidae. Conchbooks, Hackenheim, Germany

Ovulidae
Gastropods described in 1994